The George Washington Educational Campus is a facility of the New York City Department of Education located at 549 Audubon Avenue at West 193rd Street in the Fort George neighborhood of Washington Heights, Manhattan, New York City, United States. Within the building are located four schools:

 The first floor is the High School for Media and Communications (M463).
 The second floor houses  The College Academy, formerly the High School for International Business and Finance (M462).
 The third floor houses the High School for Health Careers and Sciences (M468).
 The fourth floor houses the High School for Law and Public Service (M467).

The building is located on the site of the former Fort George Amusement Park. The school opened on February 2, 1917, as an annex of Morris High School. George Washington High School was founded in 1919, and moved into the building in 1925. It was known by that name until 1999, when the building was divided into the four small schools.

George Washington Education Campus has a Works Progress Administration (WPA) mural, The Evolution of Music, painted by Lucienne Bloch in 1938. This mural was painted in a room originally used as a music room and later as a dance studio.

The campus also houses one of only two NJROTC units in New York City, in its basement, led by Commander Michael S Payne (Ret.) and Chief Petty Officer John Sikora (Ret.). New York-Presbyterian Hospital maintains a clinic on the first floor.

History

George Washington High School was relatively prestigious in the decades after its 1925 founding, graduating people such as Alan Greenspan, Henry Kissinger, and Murray Jarvik.

During the 1960s and 70s, Washington Heights' Black and Latino population increased as White flight began to occur in the neighborhood. New York City public schools also faced serious overcrowding problems, while White students began withdrawing and many schools dealt with de facto racial segregation. Although George Washington remained racially mixed through the early 1970s, the school had a tracking system that prepared White students much more effectively for college, and violence frequently broke out among gangs identifying by race. Today, the student bodies of the four George Washington schools are overwhelmingly Latino, with a minority Black presence, and less than 5% of students identify as White or Asian.

During this period, discontent with academics and school policy lead to a wave of student demonstrations, supported by a group of parents who pushed to set up an information table in the school's lobby in order to answer questions and hear complaints regarding the school. However, the United Federation of Teachers – which had also clashed with students and parents over the 1964 school boycott and the 1968 teachers' strike – perceived this as an attempt to subvert teachers' authority, leading them to strike after the administration reached a compromise with parents over the table. In 1970, George Washington saw the resignation of three principals and multiple serious incidents of violence amongst students as well as against teachers and security guards; while many safety improvements were made throughout the 1970s, its academic performance continued to decline.

In 1999, the school took its present form as the George Washington Educational Campus composed of four smaller schools. In 2018, High School for Health Careers and Sciences was threatened with closure in 2018 due to poor performance, although the proposal was later withdrawn. As of 2019, this school is the only one of the four with a four-year graduation rate above the citywide average. Part of the schools' academic difficulties is due to their high proportion of English Language Learners (as high as 50% for The College Academy and the High School for Media and Communications), who have lower graduation rates across the city.

Sports

In 1988, the George Washington Trojans football team won the 1988 City "B" Division Championship. They defeated Tilden High School in the championship game. On November 23, 2008, the squad defeated Far Rockaway High School (Queens), 20–14, in an overtime finish at the Midwood Athletic Complex in Brooklyn. The victory earned GW the 2008 PSAL Cup Championship, their first football title since 1988. Far Rock beat GW 38–8 in the season opener. It was their only loss of the season. The Trojans won their next nine games, holding their last four opponents to a total of 21 points. That included defeating previously unbeaten South Bronx HS, 24–8, to earn the trip to the championship game.

On June 6, 2008, the George Washington Trojans baseball team beat the James Madison Knights, with an 11th-inning finish of 4-0, to win the Division "A" City Championship at Shea Stadium.

On June 9, 2006, the George Washington Trojans baseball team went to the championship to play against James Monroe High School of the Bronx, but lost the championship to Monroe (#1 James Monroe 4, #3 George Washington 0). In 2004, the team went to the championship to play against Monroe High School of the Bronx but lost the championship.

In 2000, the baseball/football/track field was repaired by the City of New York, with the help of some players from the New York Yankees.

PSAL Championships 
 Cross country division champions - 1983
 Baseball - 1928, 1974, 2008 (at Shea Stadium ) 
 Soccer - 1973
 Football - 1988, 2008 and 2013

George Washington High School athletic programs 
American football team: 1928–present (no team in the late 1950s and 1960s)
Baseball: 1928–present
Volleyball: 1920s–present
Basketball:  1950s–present
Softball: 1980s–present
Cheerleading: 2006–present

Baseball coach Steve Mandl won three championships in 27 years. He was suspended by the PSAL for 16 months for "recruiting violations" and was reinstated to his job thereafter; the case prompted questions about how the PSAL handles charges brought without witnesses or evidence. According to The New York Times, "The Mandl case offers another perspective: the possibility that petty, meritless charges can get traction and turn the disciplinary process itself into a form of punishment long before a verdict has been reached."

Alumni

Alumni include:

 Moshe Arens (1925-2019), aeronautical engineer; Israeli MK and defense minister
 Shaun Abreu (born 1991), member of the New York City Council
 Harry Belafonte (born 1927), actor and singer
David A. Boehm (1914–2000), American publisher, founder of Sterling Publishing and publisher of the American version of the Guinness World Records
Maria Callas (1923-1977), opera singer.
Joseph Campanella (1924-2018), actor, younger brother of Frank Campanella
Frank Campanella (1919-2006), actor, older brother of Joseph Campanella
 Rod Carew (born 1945), Major League Baseball Hall of Famer
 Kenneth Clark (1914—2005), psychologist and expert witness for the 1954 Brown v. Board of Education decision
 Gene Colan (1926–2011), Marvel and DC Comics artist, Comic Book Hall of Fame
 Persi Diaconis (born 1945), mathematician and former professional magician
 Carl Gans (1923–2009), mechanical engineer, zoologist, herpetologist
 Alan Greenspan (born 1926), economist, Chairman of the Board of Governors of the Federal Reserve
 Morris Halle (1923-2018), linguist
 Murray Jarvik (1923–2008), UCLA pharmacologist; showed that nicotine was the addictive factor in tobacco; invented the nicotine patch for smokers trying to quit
 John George Kemeny (1926–1992), atomic scientist and computer science pioneer
 Don Kirshner (1934-2011) was an American music publisher, music consultant, rock music producer, talent manager, and songwriter. Dubbed "the Man with the Golden Ear"
 Henry Kissinger (born 1923), former United States Secretary of State, 1973 winner of the Nobel Peace Prize
 Cyril Kornbluth (1923-1958), Science Fiction author, member of the Futurians.
 Ron Perlman (born 1950), actor
 Manny Ramírez (born 1972), baseball player (did not graduate)
 Nellie Rodríguez (born 1994), baseball player
 Delmore Schwartz (1913–1966), poet, author, and critic
 William "Bill" Shea (1907–1991), lawyer, instrumental in the founding of the New York Mets and New York Islanders, namesake of Shea Stadium
 Frank Skartados (1956–2018), New York state assemblyman
Ronnie Spector (1943-2022), lead singer of The Ronettes
 Tiny Tim (1932–1996), musician
 Jerry Wexler (1917-2008), music journalist and producer
 Lester L. Wolff (1919–2021), member of Congress

References

 George Washington High School profile

External links 

 NYC Dept of Education official websites for the four academies:
 High School for International Business and Finance (M462)
 High School for Media and Communications (M463)
 High School for Law and Public Service (M467)
 High School for Health Careers and Sciences (M468)
 George Washington High School profile provided by schooltree.org

Educational institutions established in 1919
Public high schools in Manhattan
Washington Heights, Manhattan
1919 establishments in New York City